Wang Bingyu (born October 7, 1984 in Harbin, Heilongjiang; usually referred to in the media as Bingyu "Betty" Wang) is a Chinese curler.  In 2009, she became the first non Northern American or European skip to win a World Championship.

Curling career

2001-2008 
Wang began curling in 2001. By 2004, she played in her first international event- skipping the Chinese team at the World Junior B Curling Championships.  She skipped China at the 2004 Pacific Curling Championships, earning a silver medal.

In 2005, she won gold at the Pacific Junior Curling Championships, but finished in 9th place at that year's World Junior Curling Championships. At her first World Curling Championships later that year, she skipped China to a 7th-place finish with a 4–7 record. At the 2005 Pacific Curling Championships, she earned another silver medal.

In 2006, she won another gold medal at the Pacific Junior Championships, but the team did not play at the World Juniors that year; instead another Chinese team did. At the 2006 Ford World Women's Curling Championship, Wang improved her team's record to 6–5, good enough for 5th place. At the 2006 Pacific Curling Championships, Wang won her first gold medal. At this point, Wang moved from throwing last rocks to throwing third rocks, but still skipping the team. In April 2006 Wang won the Pacific International Cup.

In 2007, Wang won a disappointing bronze medal at the Asian Winter Games. At the 2007 World Women's Curling Championship, she failed to improve on the previous year, finishing with a 5–6 record in 7th place. However, she won her second gold medal at the 2007 Pacific Curling Championships.

The 2007–08 season was a dream season for the Chinese team, as they had a successful stint on the Women's World Curling Tour. They surprised many by winning their first event of the season, the 2007 Boston Pizza Shoot-Out. Their win–loss record on the tour was a respectable 20–16.

It 2008 her team easily won the gold at the 2008 National Winter Games of China.

At the 2008 Ford World Women's Curling Championship, Wang and the Chinese team surprised many by finishing the round robin in first place with a 9–2 record, including a win against the host Canadian team, skipped by Jennifer Jones. They beat the Canadians once again in the 1–2 playoff game, but they were not able to make it three in a row against the Canadians, as they lost in the final. The team won the silver medal, the first ever medal for Chinese team and Pacific team at the World Curling Championships for either gender.

2009-2014 
On February 27, 2009, Wang and her teammates won the gold at the 2009 FISU University Winter Games in Harbin, the city where she was born.

In March 2009, Wang became World Champion at the 2009 Mount Titlis World Women's Curling Championship finishing the round robin stage with a 10–1 record and beating Sweden in the final. That title is the first ever World Champions title for China in curling.

Later that year, Wang and her team also became the first non-Canadian team to reach a Grand Slam final, when they lost to Jennifer Jones at the 2009 Trail Appliances Curling Classic.

In February 2010, Wang and her team entered the 2010 Winter Olympics as the defending world champions. Wang skipped her team to a 6–3 record in round robin play, earning a spot in the medal round. After losing to Sweden in the semifinals, China defeated Switzerland to win the bronze medal. The bronze medal was the first Olympic medal for China in curling and the first team medal for China in Winter Olympic history.

In March 2010 at the 2010 Ford World Women's Curling Championship in Swift Current, Wang and her team missed the playoffs with a 6–5 record in the Round Robin stage.

On October 11, 2010, Wang and her team became the first non-Canadian team to win Grand Slam final, beating Desiree Owen at the 2010 Curlers Corner Autumn Gold Curling Classic.

Wang won a bronze medal at the 2011 Capital One World Women's Curling Championship, which would be her last podium appearance at the World Championships. Poor performances at the 2012 (11th) and 2013 (9th) World Championships failed to automatically qualify China for the 2014 Winter Olympics. However, Wang led the Chinese team to win the Olympic qualifying tournament, earning them an entry at the Olympics. At the Games, she led China to 7th-place finish with a 4-5 record.

She announced her retirement from competitive curling on November 22, 2018.

Personal life
Wang is married to Wang Guanshi.

Teammates

Grand Slam record

Former Events

References

External links
 
 Olympic profile

1984 births
Living people
Chinese female curlers
Curlers at the 2010 Winter Olympics
Curlers at the 2014 Winter Olympics
Curlers at the 2018 Winter Olympics
Olympic bronze medalists for China
Olympic curlers of China
Sportspeople from Harbin
World curling champions
Olympic medalists in curling
Medalists at the 2010 Winter Olympics
Asian Games medalists in curling
Curlers at the 2003 Asian Winter Games
Curlers at the 2007 Asian Winter Games
Curlers at the 2017 Asian Winter Games
Medalists at the 2003 Asian Winter Games
Medalists at the 2007 Asian Winter Games
Medalists at the 2017 Asian Winter Games
Asian Games gold medalists for China
Asian Games bronze medalists for China
Universiade medalists in curling
Pacific-Asian curling champions
Universiade gold medalists for China
Competitors at the 2009 Winter Universiade